Osimo Cathedral or the Church of San Leopardo (Chiesa di San Leopardo) is the principal church of Osimo in Italy, dedicated to the first bishop, Saint Leopardus. Formerly the episcopal seat of the Diocese of Osimo, it has been since 1986 a co-cathedral of the Archdiocese of Ancona-Osimo.

History 
According to local tradition the cathedral was built by the first Bishop of Osimo, Saint Leopardus (San Leopardo), in the 5th century, on an earlier pagan structure of the Roman period. Another, unverified, tradition asserts that the building was re-constructed in the 7th century by the then bishop, Saint Vitalian: there are no structural remains of that period, but there is a stone tablet dedicated to Saint Vitalian built into the crypt wall.

It was Bishop Gentile (end of the 12th century to the beginning of the 13th) who built the present presbytery and the crypt beneath. At the end of the 13th century Bishop Giovanni modified the structure of the Romanesque church by introducing Gothic elements. In 1393 the building was partially destroyed in a fire. Numerous re-buildings and extensions took place in the succeeding centuries, of which the most important were: the internal vaulting (late 15th century); the staircase to the tribune (second half of the 16th century); the new pavement and the side altars (17th century), as also the plastering of all the internal walls.

With the second half of the 19th century began what was referred to as "restoring the church", which in reality was tinkering with, if not simply destroying, the work of the preceding centuries. Thus the internal ramp which gave access to the tribune was removed, as were the two side ramps leading to the crypt (which were later replaced); two new side chapels were built, but the side altars were removed, as were the medallions bearing the portraits of the bishops of the diocese which had decorated the internal walls. In 1956 all the plastering was stripped.

Description 
In the crypt (the work of Mastro Filippo in the 12th century) are kept the relics of the martyrs of Osimo, Saints Sisinio, Fiorenzo, Diocleziano and Massimo, and the tombs of Saint Leopardus, first bishop of Osimo (4th–5th centuries), Saint Vitalian, Saint Benvenuto and Saints Victor and Corona.

Near the cathedral is the baptistry of the early 17th century with a magnificent baptismal font, the work of Pier Paolo and Tarquinio Jacometti of Recanati, with a coffered ceiling by Antonio Sarti of Jesi.

Of particular importance for the local history and faith is the wooden crucifix displayed in the cathedral, originating from the time of Bishop Gentile. It is said that on 2 July 1797 many witnesses saw the eyes of the crucified Christ move, and for that reason 2 July has since been a solemn feast.

See also
Roman Catholic Archdiocese of Ancona-Osimo

External links

 Medioevo.org: Osimo with photos 

Roman Catholic cathedrals in Italy
Cathedrals in the Marche
Roman Catholic churches in Osimo
Romanesque architecture in le Marche
Gothic architecture in le Marche
Osimo